Mchauru village is a town, village, in the country of Tanzania.

It lies at a latitude of -11.0333300 and longitude of 39.2000000 and it has an elevation of 242 meters above sea level and located 20 km from Lake Victoria.

The towns economy is based largely on agriculture and mining at the nearby Geita Gold Mine. It is also the site of the Geita Gold International School, run by AngloGold Ashanti.

References

Populated places in Mwanza Region
AngloGold Ashanti